Hickory Corner is an unincorporated community in the northwest corner of Marion Township, Owen County, in the U.S. state of Indiana. It lies near the intersection of County Road 1500 West and Orman Road, which is a community about twenty miles west of the city of Spencer, the county seat.  Its elevation is 643 feet (196 m), and it is located at  (39.3050422 -87.0444564).

Geography
 Burger Cemetery is about two miles east of this community on Orman Road, about halfway between County Road 1250 West and County Road 1325 West, which is located at  (39.3028204 -87.0077890).

School districts
 Spencer-Owen Community Schools, including a high school.

Political districts
 State House District 46
 State Senate District 39
U.S. House District 8

References

Unincorporated communities in Owen County, Indiana
Unincorporated communities in Indiana